Kevin Inkelaar (born 8 July 1997) is a Dutch cyclist, who currently rides for UCI Continental team . In October 2020, he was named in the startlist for the 2020 Vuelta a España.

Major results
2015
 2nd Overall Tour du Valromey
2017
 1st Stage 1 (TTT) Okolo Jižních Čech
2018
 2nd Overall Giro della Valle d'Aosta
1st Stage 1
2019
 3rd Overall Giro della Valle d'Aosta
1st  Points classification
1st Stage 2
 4th Overall Tour Alsace

Grand Tour general classification results timeline

References

External links

1997 births
Living people
Dutch male cyclists
Sportspeople from Leeuwarden
Cyclists from Friesland
20th-century Dutch people
21st-century Dutch people